Agios Vasileios is a village in Cyprus, 2 km south-east of Skylloura. De facto, it is under the control of Northern Cyprus.

References

Communities in Nicosia District
Populated places in Lefkoşa District